The Nagar Muslims are a Muslim community found in the state of Uttar Pradesh in India. They are Muslim converts from the larger Nagar Brahmin community. The Nagar are also known as Nagar Shaikh.

Origin
The Ahar pargana of Bulandshahr District was held by the Nagar and Nagar artisans  prior to the Muslim conquest of the region in the 11th century. During the invasion of Muhammad Ghori, many of them along with their ruler from the Barnwal community converted to Islam in a deal to prevent further bloodshed and to save the remaining community. During those times, there was a common practice in which part of the community would convert to Islam and the invader would grant clemency to the remainder of the community. The Barnwal converts were called Barani and the Nagar converts were called Nagar Muslims. Even today, many prominent Muslims from Western Uttar Pradesh belong to these communities.  As the Nagar played a key role in the 1857 War of Independence, most of their estates were confiscated. They were led by Sohrab Khan, who set himself up as the independent ruler, taking advantage of the collapse of British authority.

The Nagar Muslims reside in the ancient town of Ahar, and four neighbouring villages. Ahar is perhaps the most ancient settlement in Bulandshahr District, and is at the centre of a region where the Nagar Brahmins have been the dominant community for time immemorial.  As a landowning community, they suffered from the seizure of their estates in 1857, however many remained small to medium-sized landowners. Like other Muslim communities of similar status, they suffered as a result of the land reforms carried out by the Indian government after independence. The Nagar have never been cultivators, and many in the town of Ahar have sunk into poverty.

Present circumstances

The Nagar are largely endogamous, although there have been  a few cases of intermarriage with the Behlim Shaikh of Bulandshahr city, a community of similar status. There remains a marked preference to marry close kin, and they practice both cross cousin and parallel cousin marriages. The Nagar are Sunni Muslims, and largely Barelvi. Their customs are similar to other Shaikh communities in the Doab region. The Nagar generally speak standard Urdu.

See also
 Nagar Brahmins
 Shaikh of Uttar Pradesh

References

Social groups of Uttar Pradesh
Muslim communities of Uttar Pradesh
Muslim communities of India
Mulla Brahmins
Shaikh clans